Versus is the third, and second full-length album, by Japanese rock band Mr. Children released on September 1, 1993. The album debuted on the Japanese Oricon music charts at #3 and sold 802,140 copies during its run on the chart. Just like the previous two albums, Versus contains only one single released on July 1, 1993, titled "Replay" with another album track "And I close to you" also being included in Mr. Children's fourth single "Cross Road". Versus also marked the first time use of Takeshi Kobayashi as a writer and composer for Mr. Children.

Track listing

Personnel 
 Kazutoshi Sakurai – vocals, guitar
 Kenichi Tahara – guitar
 Keisuke Nakagawa – bass
 Hideya Suzuki – drums, vocals
 Carol Steele - percussion
 Takuo Yamamoto - tenor, baritone sax, recorder
 Yoichi Murata - trombone
 Toshio Araki - trumpet

Production 
Production credits for album:

 Producer - Takeshi Kobyashi
 Executive producer - Takamitsu Ide, Mitsunori Kadoike
 Recording - Kunihiko Imai, Hiroshi Hiranuma, and Doug Conroy
 Mixing - Hiroshi Hiranuma, Kunihiko Imai
 Brass arrangement - Takuo Yamamoto
 A&R chief - Koichi Inaba
 A&R director - Makoto Nakanishi, Katsumi Shinohara
 Computer programming - Ken Matsumoto
 Assistant engineering - Greg Digesu, Jeff Mauriello, Kenji Nagashima, Yoshitaka Shirahata, Kei Kosaka, and Tomoaki Sato
 Recording - Waterfront Studios, Tokyo Hilton Hotel, Hitokuchizaka Studio, and Avaco Studio
 Mixed at - Peninsula, Studio Vincent
 Mastering - Gateway Mastering
 Mastered by - Bob Ludwig
 U.S production supervision - Kaz Hayashida
 Account Administration - Jeff Schwartz and Rupert Gray
 Translator - Rika Nakaya
 Recording co-ordination - Akira Yasukawa
 Promotion - Naoki Imoto
 Sales promotion - Masayuki Nakagawa
 Art Direction - Mitsuo Shindo
 Designer - Satoshi Nakamura
 Photographer - Meisa Fujishiro
 Stylist - Hiroko Umeyama
 Marine coordinator - Masato Nagai
 Artist management - Isao Tanuma and Kazushiro Miura
 Desk management - Tomoko Okada
 Production management - Tetsuhiko /nono
 Production co-ordination - Harumi Oshima
 P.R management - Chikane Kumagai

Footnotes

a. Kunihiko Imai is credited for mixing and recording the song "Replay" only.
b. For the song "Main Street ni ikou" and "Toubousha".

References 

1993 albums
Mr. Children albums
Albums produced by Takeshi Kobayashi
Japanese-language albums